Starków may refer to the following places in Poland:
Starków, Lower Silesian Voivodeship (south-west Poland)
Starków, Lubusz Voivodeship (west Poland)
Starków, Szczecin